Discoglossus (common name: painted frogs) is a genus of frogs in the family Alytidae (formerly Discoglossidae) found in southern Europe and northwestern Africa.

Species
Six species are placed in this genus. The Hula painted frog (Latonia nigriventer) was included in this genus until further genetic analysis placed this frog in the genus Latonia.

References

 C. Michael Hogan. 2012. Discoglossus. African Amphibians Lifedesk. ed. Breda Zimkus.
 A. Salvador. 1996.  Amphibians of Northwest Africa. Smithsonian Herpetological Information Service. 109, 1-43.

 
Painted frogs
Amphibians of Europe
Amphibians of North Africa
Amphibian genera
Taxa named by Carl Adolf Otth